Holo is a Bantu language of Angola and the Democratic Republic of Congo. Yeci, Samba or Hungu may be separate languages.

References

Pende languages